The 50-episode anime series Digimon Frontier, produced by Toei Animation in 2002, is the fourth series in the Digimon franchise. It does not follow the plot of any of its three predecessors, Digimon Adventure and Digimon Adventure 02 and Digimon Tamers. Instead, the story features five children who are prompted by unusual phone messages to go to a subway station and take a train to the Digital World. After two secondary characters, Bokomon and Neemon, reveal that the Digital World is in danger, the children gain the power to transform into Digimon in order to stop the forces seeking to destroy the Digital World. The series was directed by Yukio Kaikawa and written by Sukehiro Tomita and Akatsuki Yamatoya, featuring music by Takanori Arisawa.

The season aired 50 episodes on Fuji TV in Japan from April 7, 2002 to March 30, 2003. Unlike the previous three series, Digimon Frontier aired on UPN in the United States, beginning on September 9, 2002 to July 14, 2003, and later re-aired on ABC Family Channel. In Canada, the series aired on YTV. The series was also scheduled to air in the United Kingdom on Fox Kids UK, though the scheduling plans were eventually cancelled and never aired on the programming block, being instead taken over by Transformers Armada. On 27 February 2007, this series of Digimon was first aired in Australia on Toasted TV despite that it was already shown on Cheez TV in 2003. The Latino American version was first aired from March to June 2003 on weekdays at 8:30 p.m. (-4 GMT) on Fox Kids. The first four episodes were aired on Sunday during the Digimon Tamers marathon.

Kōji Wada's song "FIRE!!" was used as the opening theme for the series.  The two ending themes were "Innocent ~Mujaki na Mama de~", by Kōji Wada, and "an Endless tale" by Kōji Wada and Ai Maeda.

The fourth season of Digimon: Digital Monsters (aka Digimon Frontier) was formerly licensed by Disney's Sensation Animation in North America, and was also formerly distributed by Buena Vista Television and BVS Entertainment, also in North America, when it aired on Disney's One Too on UPN, Toon Disney and ABC Family Channel. After the first four seasons of Digimon, Disney and BVS Entertainment had lost the rights to continue dubbing Digimon, the rest of Digimon was handled and dubbed in English by Studiopolis before Saban Brands’s acquisition of Digimon, for Example, the un-dubbed four Digimon movies were dubbed by Studiopolis: Revenge of Diaboromon (DA02), Battle of Adventurers (DT), Runaway Locomon (DT) and Island of the Lost Digimon (DF) in 2005 and the fifth TV season, Digimon Data Squad in 2007.

Episode list

Volume DVDs

North American Release
New Video Group released a complete DVD box set release of Frontier on September 10, 2013. Like previous releases, it is an 8-disc, English dub collection.

Japanese Release

See also
 Digimon

Notes

Digimon Frontier
2002 Japanese television seasons
2003 Japanese television seasons
Frontier